Chan Ka Ho (born 27 January 1996) is a Hong Kong professional footballer who currently plays as a goalkeeper for Hong Kong Premier League club Lee Man.

Club career
Chan was promoted to the first team of Kitchee in 2014. Starting from 2017, Chan spent three seasons on loan at Yuen Long.

On 3 July 2020, it was announced that Chan had been loaned to Lee Man. He officially joined the club after the end of the 2019–20 season.

International career
On 24 July 2022, Chan made his international debut for Hong Kong in the 2022 EAFF E-1 Football Championship against South Korea.

Honours

Club
Kitchee
 Hong Kong Premier League: 2014–15
 Hong Kong League Cup: 2014–15, 2015–16
 Hong Kong FA Cup: 2014–15
 Hong Kong Senior Shield: 2016–17
Yuen Long	
 Hong Kong Senior Shield: 2017–18

International
Hong Kong
 Guangdong-Hong Kong Cup: 2018

References

External links
 
 Chan Ka Ho at HKFA
 

Living people
1996 births
Hong Kong footballers
Association football goalkeepers
Hong Kong Premier League players
Kitchee SC players
Yuen Long FC players
Lee Man FC players